NA-137 Okara-III is a constituency for the National Assembly of Pakistan.

Members of Parliament

2018-2022: NA-143 Okara-III

Election 2002 

General elections were held on 10 Oct 2002. Rao Muhammad Ajmal Khan an Independent candidate won by 62,711  votes.

Election 2008 

General elections were held on 18 Feb 2008. Mian Manzoor Ahmad Khan Wattoo an Independent candidate won by 46,941 votes.

Election 2013 

General elections were held on 11 May 2013. Rao Muhammad Ajmal Khan of PML-N won by 109,998 votes and became the  member of National Assembly.

Election 2018 

General elections were held on 25 July 2018.

See also
NA-136 Okara-II
NA-138 Okara-IV

References

External links 
 Election result's official website

NA-146